The Park Range, elevation approximately , is a mountain range in the Rocky Mountains of northwestern Colorado in the United States. The range forms a relatively isolated part of the Continental Divide, extending north-to-south for approximately  along the boundary between Jackson (east) and Routt counties. It separates North Park in the upper basin of the North Platte River on the east from the Elk River basin in the watershed of the Yampa River the west. It rises steeply out of the Yampa River basin, forming a climatic barrier that receives much snowfall in winter. The northern end of the range lies in Wyoming and is known as the Sierra Madre Range.

Steamboat Springs, a popular ski resort community, sits on the southwestern flank of the range, at the base of Mount Werner.  Much of the range is located within the Routt National Forest, with the summit of the ridge located within the Mount Zirkel Wilderness, named for Mount Zirkel, elevation . The range is prominently visible from both sides and forms a picturesque skyline from much of North Park.  It is traversed at its southern end by Rabbit Ears Pass which carries  US 40. It is also traversed by Buffalo Pass which carries a gravel road between Steamboat Springs and Walden, and which is traversable by most vehicles in good weather during summer.

See also 

 Sierra Madre Range
 Elkhead Mountains

References

External links 

 Park Range @ fs.usda
 Park Range @ Peakbagger
 Park Range @ summitpost
 Park Range @ 100summits

Ranges of the Rocky Mountains
Mountain ranges of Colorado
Landforms of Routt County, Colorado
Landforms of Jackson County, Colorado